The 2017 National Football League, known for sponsorship reasons as the Allianz Football League, was the 86th staging of the National Football League, an annual Gaelic football tournament for Gaelic Athletic Association county teams. Thirty-one county teams from the island of Ireland, plus London, compete. Kilkenny do not participate.

On 9 April 2017 Kerry won their 20th National League title, beating Dublin by 0-20 to 1-16 in the final. Dublin were the reigning champions and were bidding for their fifth successive title.

Eir Sport (formerly Setanta) and TG4 provided live coverage of the league on Saturday nights and Sunday afternoons respectively. RTÉ2 broadcast highlights programme Allianz League Sunday on Sunday evenings. TG4 broadcast the final of each division live.

Format

League structure
The 2017 National Football League consists of four divisions of eight teams. Each team plays every other team in its division once, usually four home and three away or three home and four away. Two points are awarded for a win and one point for a draw.

Tie-breaker
If only two teams are level on league points -
 The team that won the head-to-head match is ranked first
 If this game was a draw, score difference (total scored minus total conceded in all games) is used to rank the teams
 If score difference is identical, total scored is used to rank the teams
 If still identical, a play-off is required
If three or more teams are level on league points, score difference is used to rank the teams.

Finals, promotions and relegations

Division 1
Following the decision to abolish the National Football League semi finals for 2017, the top two teams in Division 1 contest the National Football League final. The bottom two teams are relegated to Division 2.

Division 2, Division 3 & Division 4
The top two teams in Divisions 2, 3 and 4 are promoted and contest the finals of their respective divisions. The bottom two teams in Divisions 2 and 3 are relegated.

Division 1

Division 1 table

Division 1 Rounds 1 to 7

Division 1 Round 1

Division 1 Round 2

Division 1 Round 3

Division 1 Round 4

Division 1 Round 5

Division 1 Round 6

Division 1 Round 7

Division 1 Final

Division 2

Division 2 table

Division 2 Rounds 1 to 7

Division 2 Round 1

Division 2 Round 2

Division 2 Round 3

Division 2 Round 4

Division 2 Round 5

Division 2 Round 6

Division 2 Round 7

Division 2 Final

Division 3

Division 3 table

Division 3 Rounds 1 to 7

Division 3 Round 1

Division 3 Round 2

Division 3 Round 3

Division 3 Round 4

Division 3 Round 5

Division 3 Round 6

Division 3 Round 7

Division 3 Final

Division 4

Division 4 table

Division 4 Rounds 1 to 7

Division 4 Round 1

Division 4 Round 2

Division 4 Round 3

Division 4 Round 4

Division 4 Round 5

Division 4 Round 6

Division 4 Round 7

Division 4 Final

League Statistics
All scores correct as of 12 April 2017

Scoring Events
Widest winning margin: 30
 Armagh 6-22 – 0-10 Offaly (Division 3)
Most goals in a match: 7
Galway 5-15 – 2-15 Derry (Division 2)
Offaly 3-15 – 4-11 Laois (Division 3)
Most points in a match: 43
Dublin 2-29 – 0-14 Roscommon (Division 1)
Most goals by one team in a match: 6
Armagh 6-22 – 0-10 Offaly (Division 3)
 Highest aggregate score: 51 points
Galway 5-15 – 2-15 Derry (Division 2)
Lowest aggregate score: 14 points
Monaghan 0-07 – 0-07 Cavan (Division 1)

Top Scorer: Overall

Top Scorer: Single game

References

External links
 Full Fixtures and Results 

 
National Football League
National Football League (Ireland) seasons